Natasja Andreasen (born 31 October 2000) is a Danish handball player for Silkeborg-Voel KFUM and the Danish national junior team.

She also represented Denmark in the 2019 Women's Junior European Handball Championship, placing 6th.

References

2000 births
Living people
People from Silkeborg
Danish female handball players
Sportspeople from the Central Denmark Region